Live at Austin City Limits Music Festival 2007: Kevin Devine is a digital only release of Kevin Devine's performance at the Austin City Limits Music Festival on September 15, 2007. It was released through iTunes and other digital music stores. It was also released in both MP3 and Flac format on Live Downloads.

The band Manchester Orchestra served as Kevin's band for this performance. Kevin has frequently collaborated with members of the band, most notably on their split release I Could Be the Only One and as a part of Bad Books, a band featuring Devine and members of Manchester Orchestra.

The performance also featured a cover of the Neutral Milk Hotel song "Holland, 1945", which has been frequently covered live by the two artists and features as a bonus track on the original Academy Fight Song vinyl of Put Your Ghost to Rest (and later the 2007 Tour EP and Splitting Up Christmas single).

Track listing
 "The Burning City Smoking"  – 4:35
 "It's Only Your Life"  – 6:06
 "No Time Flat"  – 4:41
 "Ballgame"  – 5:01
 "Brooklyn Boy"  – 3:18
 "Yr Damned Ol' Dad"  – 2:34
 "Trouble"  – 2:48
 "Just Stay"  – 4:18
 "Holland, 1945"  – 3:36
 "Cotton Crush"  – 3:52

References

Kevin Devine albums
2007 live albums